Toda Max is a Philippine situational comedy series on ABS-CBN from November 5, 2011 to November 16, 2013. This series was starring with Robin Padilla,  Pokwang, Angel Locsin,  and Vhong Navarro. though due to 3 movie commitments, Padilla decided to leave the show in early of 2013 and hoped to come back after doing all his movies.

Overview

Synopsis
After the tragic death of his wife, Bartolome decides to leave the province and move to his cousin's house in Manila with his two kids. He's shocked with the high standard of living in the city, but is still determined to create a comfortable life for his family. Meanwhile, his cousin Justin is trying hard to earn money as a cook in a small-time eatery. Together, they will face life's challenges with much enthusiasm and lessons learned along the way.

Finale
Toda Max was originally going to air its final episode on November 16, 2013 after 2 years of airing and will be replaced by Home Sweetie Home but the former was extended by one more episode due to the month-long  second anniversary special as well as the delayed telecast due to the victims of Typhoon Yolanda.

Cast and characters

Main cast
 Vhong Navarro as Justino "Justin Bibbo" Batumbakal, Jr.
 Angel Locsin as Isabel Padausdos
 Pokwang as Beverly "Lady G." Gil
 Ai-Ai delas Alas as Vangie "Ate Van" Batumbakal

Supporting cast
 Izzy Canillo as Ronald Batumbakal
 Myrtle Sarrosa as Myrtle "Tita Maristela"
 Paul Salas as Jonas
 Al Tantay as Macario "Mac" Padausdos
 Darwin Tolentino as Hap Rice
 Alex Calleja as Alex
 Cecil Paz as Wendy
 Marvin Yap as Marvin
 Virgilio del Carmel as Virgilio

Former cast
 Robin Padilla as Bartolome "Tol" Batumbakal 
 Aaliyah Benisano as Sandy Batumbakal
 Jobert Austria as Bruno

Guest cast

 Val Iglesias as Lady G's bully ex-husband
 Candy Pangilinan as Madam Apple
 Isabella Manjon as Cristy
 Cacai Bautista as Yaya Aguila
 Pilita Corrales as Lola Momsie
 Kim Chiu as Maimai 
 Jojit Lorenzo as Pandong
 Paloma as Angelica Goli
 Melai Cantiveros as Nikki
 Beverly Salviejo as Rihanna
 Bea Alonzo as Sasi 
 Rayver Cruz as Jun-Jun
 Smokey Manaloto as Benny Maniniquil
 Maliksi Morales as Niknok Maniniquil
 Cristine Reyes as Joy Maligaya
 Joey Marquez as Daniel
 Randy Santiago as Baby Manoling
 Matteo Guidicelli as Matt Alvarado
 Neil Coleta as Carding
 Marina Benipayo as Matt's Mother
 Jake Cuenca as Felix Bakat
 Phil Younghusband as Tisoy
 Jodi Sta. Maria as Selena Golez
 Maja Salvador as Darling Padausdos
 Bentong as Ben Chan
 Rommel Padilla as Romy
 Toni Gonzaga as Maxene
 Dennis Padilla as Brutus
 Bayani Agbayani as Thor
 Gerald Anderson as Buddy Torres
 Valerie Concepcion as Dianne
 Dominic Ochoa as Johnny
 Bing Davao as Tricycle operator
 Benjie Paras as Benjo
 Dennis Padilla as Mando
 Angel Sy as Jessica
 April Boy Regino as Boogie
 Nash Aguas as Bugoy
 Sharlene San Pedro as Shane
 Trina Legaspi as Jessica
 Dick Israel as Bar Customer
 Leo Martinez as Lloydie
 Lilia Cuntapay as White Lady
 Ogie Diaz as Mamu
 Angeline Quinto as Angeline Quintas
 Jamilla Obispo as Maxim
 Gina Pareño as Gorgonia
 Kiray Celis as Jeng-Jeng
 K Brosas as Madame K
 Carmina Villarroel as Chef Mina
 Marco Gumabao as Marco
 Enrique Gil as Jojo Alahas
 Ella Cruz as Betty
 Jhong Hilario as Papa Gangnam
 Sam Milby as Doc Milby
 Anjo Yllana as Dino Tengco (character from the classic sitcom Abangan Ang Susunod Na Kabanata)
 Billy Crawford as Paolo
 Rufa Mae Quinto as Wei Da
 Ruffa Gutierrez as Susie
 Keempee de Leon as Wella
 Maricar Reyes as Lady Z (alter-ego of Lady G)
 Jon Avila as (alter-ego of Tatay Mac)
 Xian Lim as Earl
 Meg Imperial as Gem
 Gretchen Barretto
 Ruby Rodriguez as Myka
 Daniel Matsunaga as Victor
 Iza Calzado as Ka Iza
 Eula Valdez as Dra. Yola
 Nikki Gil as Carly Crawford
 Alex Gonzaga as Leila
 Joross Gamboa as Martin
 Gio Alvarez as Ricky
 Hyubs Azarcon as Johnny
 Kean Cipriano as James
 Keanna Reeves as Lola
 Diana Zubiri as Alex
 Andrew E. as himself
 Sexbomb Girls as Yoga Girls
 Jon Santos as Ate Bhe
 Janice de Belen as Janet Magpoles
 Jericho Rosales as Sir Chef

As themselves
 Jai Agpangan
 Joj Agpangan
 Karen Reyes
 Kit Thompson
 Ryan Boyce
 Erich Gonzales
 Jessy Mendiola
 Danilo Barrios
 Julia Montes
 Zanjoe Marudo
 Kathryn Bernardo
 Daniel Padilla
 Kaye Abad
 Bugoy Drilon
 Maricel Soriano
 Candy Pangilinan
 Laudico Guevarra
 Nadia Montenegro
 Jason Abalos
 German Moreno
 Nene Tamayo
 Bea Saw
 Keanna Reeves
 Slater Young

Anniversary episodes

Guest cast
 Epi Quizon as Tim
 Vandolph Quizon as Tom
 Ai-Ai delas Alas as Aina
 Edgar Mortiz as Bobot
 Tirso Cruz III as Pip
 Richard Gomez as Ricky
 Rommel Padilla as Gabriel
 Lou Veloso as Uncle Mapaginitan
 Dawn Zulueta as Emily Mapaginitan
 Sam Milby
 Kim Chiu
 Maja Salvador
 Alexa Ilacad as Jing 
 Nash Aguas as Darryl
 Chicosci
 Kean Cipriano
 Tutti Caringal
 Basilyo
 Atoy Co
 Sylvia Sanchez
 Mahal
 JC de Vera as Jake
 Sunshine Cruz
 Arjo Atayde
 Kyle Banzon

Awards and nominations

See also
List of programs broadcast by ABS-CBN

References

External links
 

ABS-CBN original programming
Philippine television sitcoms
2011 Philippine television series debuts
2013 Philippine television series endings
Filipino-language television shows